Jan Sahl (born 20 April 1950 in Meløy) is a Norwegian politician who has been a member of the Norwegian Parliament for Nordland County since 1997. He is a member of the Christian Democratic Party.

References

1950 births
Living people
Christian Democratic Party (Norway) politicians
Members of the Storting
21st-century Norwegian politicians
20th-century Norwegian politicians
People from Meløy
Nordland politicians